Tatyana Titova may refer to:

 Tatyana Titova (runner) (born 1965), Russian long-distance runner
 Tatyana Titova (synchronised swimmer) (born 1967), Russian synchronised swimmer